Djedefhor or Hordjedef was a noble Egyptian of the 4th Dynasty. He was the son of Pharaoh Khufu and his name means "Enduring Like Horus".

Biography

Djedefhor was a son of Pharaoh Khufu and half-brother of pharaohs Djedefre and Khafre. Queen Meritites I is named in the tomb G 7220 of Djedefhor and it is possible she is his mother.

He is mentioned on an inscription in Wadi Hammamat, his name appears in a cartouche, written after the names of Khufu, Djedefre and Khafre, preceding the name of another of his brothers, Baufra. There is no evidence that either Djedefhor or Baufra ruled as a pharaoh, even though only pharaohs' names were written in cartouches during the 4th dynasty.

The Teachings of Djedefhor, a document of which only fragments remain, is attributed to him. Djedefhor seems to have been deified after his death. The wisdom text by Djedefhor was written as advice to his son, Prince Auibra.

Titles
Djedefhor's titles were:

Translation and indexes from Dilwyn Jones.

Burial
He was still alive during the reign of Menkaure, Khufu's grandson. Hence he must have been buried towards the end of the Fourth Dynasty. Djedefhor was buried in mastaba G 7210–7220 in the east field which is part of the Giza pyramid complex. His sarcophagus is now in the Egyptian Museum in Cairo.

Appearance in ancient Egyptian fiction
He is one of the main characters in a story included in the Papyrus Westcar. In the text of that papyrus, Djedefhor is mentioned as one who brought the soothsayer and magician called Djedi to the court of Khufu. This Djedi was inspired by real Prince Djedi, who was a son of Prince Rahotep and nephew to Khufu.

Sources

External links
 The Ancient Egypt Site

Princes of the Fourth Dynasty of Egypt
Khufu